Miguel Molina González (born 17 February 1989) is a professional racing driver from Spain. He currently competes in the FIA World Endurance Championship and other selected GT races for AF Corse. He was a member of the Circuit de Catalunya Young Drivers Programme.

Career

Karting
Like many racing drivers, Molina started his early motorsport career in karting, winning successive Spanish Cadet Championships in 1999 and 2000, as well as the Catalan Junior Championship in 2001 and Spanish Junior Championship in 2003.

Early career
In 2004, Molina began his single-seater career in the Spanish Formula Junior 1600 series, where he finished the season in 6th place. The following year he stepped up to the Eurocup Formula Renault 2.0 championship with Pons Racing, scoring three points to finish the season 28th overall. In 2006, he switched to the Spanish Formula Three Championship with the Racing Engineering team, taking one race win and a further five podium finishes to end the season 6th in the standings.

Formula Renault 3.5 Series
Towards the end of 2006, Molina joined the Formula Renault 3.5 Series with GD Racing, competing in the final six races of the season, scoring a point in the final race of the season at Barcelona.

For 2007, Molina moved up to the series full-time with Pons Racing, scoring two race wins (at Estoril and Barcelona) and two further podium places on his way to 7th in the final standings. In 2008 he once again competed in the championship, teaming up with fellow Spanish driver Álvaro Barba at Prema Powerteam. He claimed four podiums during the season, including race wins at the Nürburgring and Estoril, to finish 4th in the championship. After testing for Prema, Epsilon Euskadi and KTR during the off-season, Molina was signed by Ultimate Motorsport for the 2009 season. Despite the team pulling out of the final two rounds, Molina finished eighth in the championship.

Superleague Formula
In June 2009, Molina made his debut in the Superleague Formula series, taking part in the opening round of the season at Magny-Cours for Al Ain. He finished the first race in ninth before taking fourth place in the second event.

DTM

Molina moved from single-seaters to touring cars in 2010, joining the works Audi Sport Team Abt Sportsline squad in the DTM series, where he raced a 2008-spec Audi A4.

Racing record

Career summary

† Team standings.
‡ Ineligible for points.
* Season still in progress.

Complete Formula Renault 3.5 Series results
(key) (Races in bold indicate pole position) (Races in italics indicate fastest lap)

Superleague Formula
(key)

Super Final Results

Complete Deutsche Tourenwagen Masters results
(key) (Races in bold indicate pole position) (Races in italics indicate fastest lap)

† Driver did not finish, but completed 75% of the race distance.

Complete Stock Car Brasil results

† Ineligible for championship points.

Complete FIA World Endurance Championship results
(key) (Races in bold indicate pole position; races in
italics indicate fastest lap)

* Season still in progress.

Complete 24 Hours of Le Mans results

Complete IMSA SportsCar Championship results
(key) (Races in bold indicate pole position; races in italics indicate fastest lap)

* Season still in progress.

Complete European Le Mans Series results

‡ Half points awarded as less than 75% of race distance was completed.

References

External links

Official Site 
Career details from Driver Database

1989 births
Living people
Sportspeople from Girona
Spanish racing drivers
Catalan racing drivers
Formula Renault Eurocup drivers
Euroformula Open Championship drivers
Superleague Formula drivers
Deutsche Tourenwagen Masters drivers
World Series Formula V8 3.5 drivers
Stock Car Brasil drivers
24 Hours of Le Mans drivers
24 Hours of Daytona drivers
European Le Mans Series drivers
FIA World Endurance Championship drivers
Prema Powerteam drivers
GT World Challenge America drivers
Motorsport team owners
AF Corse drivers
Blancpain Endurance Series drivers
WeatherTech SportsCar Championship drivers
Audi Sport drivers
Abt Sportsline drivers
Phoenix Racing drivers
Pons Racing drivers
Racing Engineering drivers
Karting World Championship drivers
Australian Endurance Championship drivers
SMP Racing drivers
Nürburgring 24 Hours drivers
Saintéloc Racing drivers
Ferrari Competizioni GT drivers
Iron Lynx drivers
Asian Le Mans Series drivers